Annette O'Toole (born Annette Toole; April 1, 1952) is an American actress. She is known for portraying Lisa Bridges in the television series Nash Bridges, adult Beverly Marsh in the 1990 television mini-series adaptation of Stephen King's epic horror novel It, Lana Lang in Superman III, Kathy in the romantic-comedy film Cross My Heart and Martha Kent (the mother of Clark Kent) on the television series Smallville.

Early life and career
O'Toole was born in Houston, Texas, the daughter of Dorothy Geraldine (née Niland) and William West Toole Jr. Her mother taught dance, which O'Toole herself began learning at the age of three. She started taking acting lessons after her family moved to Los Angeles when she was 13. Her first television appearance was in 1967 on The Danny Kaye Show, followed over the next few years with guest appearances in shows such as My Three Sons, The Virginian, Gunsmoke, Hawaii Five-O, and The Partridge Family.

1970s–1980s
O'Toole's first major film role was as a jaded beauty pageant contestant in the 1975 satire Smile; she got the role after doing an impression of a "dead cockroach" at the audition. She also appeared as the tutor and girlfriend of Robby Benson's character in the college basketball story One on One in 1977. She co-starred opposite Gary Busey in the 1980 film Foolin' Around. In 1981, she starred in the HBO onstage production of Vanities, as well as in the TV movie Stand By Your Man, which detailed the life of country music legend Tammy Wynette. Later on in 1982, she appeared briefly as Nick Nolte's girlfriend in 48 Hrs. That same year, she played Alice Perrin in Cat People, and then in 1983 she played Lana Lang (love interest to Clark Kent/Superman), and single mother of Ricky in Superman III.

In 1985, she co-starred with Barry Manilow in the CBS television movie Copacabana playing Lola La Mar to Manilow's Tony Starr. Also in 1985, she had a starring role as Ms. Edmunds in the original Bridge to Terabithia, and appeared in the TV adaptation of Strong Medicine the following year. In 1987's Cross My Heart, a romantic comedy, O'Toole had a leading role opposite Martin Short.

1990s–2000s
In 1990, O'Toole had roles in two ABC television mini-series. She played the adult Beverly Marsh in the television mini-series adaptation of Stephen King's epic horror novel It and also portrayed Rose Fitzgerald Kennedy in The Kennedys of Massachusetts, a role that earned her an Emmy nomination for Outstanding Lead Actress. She next starred in the 1992 NBC mini-series Jewels, based on the Danielle Steel novel of the same name.

In 1993, O'Toole starred in Desperate Justice as Ellen Wells. In 1995, she starred as Cheryl Keeton in the 1995 Lifetime television film based on Ann Rule's true crime novel Dead by Sunset. She had a recurring role on the television show Nash Bridges (1996) and starred in her own series The Huntress (2000) as a female bounty hunter. In 1997 O'Toole starred in the TV movie Keeping the Promise.

In October 2001, 18 years after portraying Lana Lang in Superman III, O'Toole returned to the Superman mythos in the role of Martha Kent, Superman's adoptive mother, in the television series Smallville. She remained part of the show's main cast, though at times in the background, until the end of its sixth season. On January 19, 2010, it was announced that O'Toole would be returning to Smallville for at least one episode.

2010s 
On November 22, 2010, O'Toole played the role of Veronica, a middle-aged woman with a severe case of Alzheimer's, in season 3 episode 7 of the TV series Lie to Me. In March 2013 she appeared in Grey's Anatomy as a school teacher who finds out, after surgery, that she will die from cancer. O'Toole portrayed Susan Emerson in six episodes of the first two seasons of Halt and Catch Fire. In 2016, O'Toole returned to the Stephen King realm as boarding house owner Edna Price in 'The Kill Floor' episode of the King mini-series 11.22.63. O'Toole filled the role of Hope McCrea in the Netflix series Virgin River.

Musical career
O'Toole can date the beginning of her songwriting career to events during a car ride after the September 11 attacks; as her husband Michael McKean describes it, "On September 11, 2001, Annette found herself without an airline to carry her back down to Los Angeles from Vancouver, where she films Smallville. So she drove a rental car down. The two of us drove it back up together, and on the long drive up there, somewhere between Portland and Seattle, she told me she had a tune in her head." The "tune in her head" became "Potato's in the Paddy Wagon", one of three songs the couple wrote for A Mighty Wind, including the Oscar-nominated song "A Kiss at the End of the Rainbow."

O'Toole sang "What Could Be Better?"—a song she and her husband co-wrote – for the 2004 Disney children's album A World of Happiness.

In May–June 2005, the couple did a cabaret act for "Feinstein's at the Regency" in New York City.

On July 7, 2007, O'Toole appeared as a backing singer for her husband's fictional band Spinal Tap at the London leg of the Live Earth concerts. She has also performed on the band's 2009 Unwigged and Unplugged tour, and contributed lyrics to "Short and Sweet" on the 2009 Spinal Tap album Back from the Dead.

In 2011 she starred in CAP21's production of the new musical Southern Comfort, based on the Sundance award-winning documentary, by Dan Collins and Julianne Wick Davis.

Personal life

O'Toole married actor Bill Geisslinger on April 8, 1983; they divorced in 1993. The couple had two daughters. O'Toole married Michael McKean in March 1999. She and McKean share a musical career.

Filmography

References

External links
 

1952 births
Living people
20th-century American actresses
20th-century American singers
20th-century American women singers
21st-century American actresses
21st-century American singers
21st-century American women singers
Actresses from Houston
American female dancers
American film actresses
American musical theatre actresses
American television actresses
Dancers from Texas
Songwriters from Texas